The Ambassador Extraordinary and Plenipotentiary of Ukraine to the United Kingdom is the ambassador of Ukraine to the United Kingdom. The current ambassador is Vadym Prystaiko. He assumed the position in 2020.

The first Ukrainian ambassador to the United Kingdom assumed his post in 1992, the same year a Ukrainian embassy opened in London.

List of representatives

Ukrainian People's Republic
 1919 — Mykola Stakhovsky
 1919 — 1921 — Arnold Margolin 
 1921 — 1923 — Jaroslav Olesnitsky
 1923 — 1924 — Roman Smal-Stocki

Ukraine
 1992 — 1997 — Serhiy Komisarenko
 1997 — 2002 — Volodymyr Vasylenko
 2002 — 2005 — Ihor Mityukov
 2005 — 2010 — Ihor Kharchenko
 2010 — 2014 — Volodymyr Khandohiy
 2014 — Andrii Kuzmenko — Chargé d'Affaires a.i.
 2014 — Ihor Kyzym — Chargé d'Affaires a.i. (Acting)
 2015 — 2020 —  Natalia Galibarenko
 2020 — present — Vadym Prystaiko

See also 
 Embassy of Ukraine, London
 British Ambassador to Ukraine

References

External links 
  Embassy of Ukraine to the United Kingdom: Previous Ambassadors

Ambassadors of Ukraine to the United Kingdom
United Kingdom, the
Ukraine